Kennard School or Kennard Schools or variant, may refer to:

Secondary schools

 Kennard High School, Kennard, Indiana, USA
 Kennard School, Queen Anne's County, Maryland, USA; predecessor to the Queen Anne's County High School
 Kennard-Dale High School, Fawngrove, York County, Pennsylvania, USA
 Kennard High School, Kennard, Texas, USA

Primary schools
 Kennard Elementary School, Queen Anne's County, Maryland, USA; see Queen Anne's County High School

Other
 Kennard Independent School District, Kennard, Texas, USA

See also
 Kennard (disambiguation)